Michael or Mike Sutton may refer to:
Michael Sutton (actor) (born 1970), American actor
Mike Sutton (basketball) (born 1956), American basketball coach
Mike Sutton (American football) (born 1975), American football player
Mike Sutton (footballer) (born 1944), English footballer
Mike Sutton (criminologist) (born 1959), English criminologist
Michael Kelly Sutton (born 1987), software engineer, entrepreneur and minimalist 
Tony Sutton (cricketer) (Michael Antony Sutton, 1921–2019), English cricketer
Michael H. Sutton, director of Krispy Kreme Corporation
Michael A. Sutton, American professor
Mike Sutton, of American musical duo Mike & Brenda Sutton
Buffalax, a Youtuber known for creating misheard lyric videos including "Benny Lava"

See also
Mickey Sutton (disambiguation)